Guelph Royals could mean: 

 Guelph Royals (baseball), a team in the Intercounty Baseball League
 Guelph Royals (ice hockey), a former junior ice hockey team in the Ontario Hockey Association